Steve Hare may refer to:
 Steve Hare (businessman)
 Steve Hare (musician)